Persuasion System is a mini-LP by American musician Seth Haley under his stage name Com Truise. It was released on May 17, 2019, by Ghostly International. It received generally favorable reviews from critics.

Background and release 
Seth Haley's previous works Galactic Melt (2011), Wave 1 (2014), Silicon Tare (2016), and Iteration (2017), tells the story of a space traveler named Com Truise. Iteration was the last album about the story. According to Haley's label Ghostly International, with Persuasion System, "Haley leaves the past narrative behind". According to Ghostly, the album "began as an experiment. Haley switched digital audio workstations, rebuilt his palette of sounds, and tasked himself with simply trying it out".

On March 5, 2019, he announced the album while also releasing its first single, "Existence Schematic". A second single, the title-track, was released on April 10. On May 15, "Ultrafiche of You", the third and final single, was released. A music video for it was released on June 19th, which, as described by Ghostly, is a "metaphysical journey through the seasons of life."

Reception 

On review aggregator Metacritic, Persuasion System has a rating of 71/100, indicating "generally favorable reviews", while, on review aggregator AnyDecentMusic?, the album has a rating of 6.4/10. Critics found the album similar to Haley's previous work; Paul Simpson wrote to AllMusic that "Persuasion System signals a bit of a different approach for Haley, but not so much that it will alienate anyone who enjoyed his earlier releases," while Simon K. wrote to Sputnikmusic that "It's not a bad album by any means and if you like his work, this will deliver in all the ways you’d expect, but in that regard that’s half the problem."

Track listing

References 

2019 albums
Com Truise albums
Ghostly International albums